Cherso (old name:   Hersovo / Hirsova) is a village in the Kilkis region of Greece. It is situated in the municipal unit of Cherso, in the Kilkis municipality, within the Kilkis region of Central Macedonia.

Since the 2011 local government reform (Kallikratis Plan), it has been part of the municipality Kilkis, of which it is a municipal unit. The municipal unit has an area of 157.907 km2. Population 2,629 (2011). In the municipal unit of Cherso lies the historical village of Kalindria. Kalindria was found by Paeonians in 3rd millennium BC, and it is inhabited today. In the Macedonian Struggle, the people of Kalindria fought hard against Bulgarians and Turkish authorities, and it was one of the main centres of Greek resistance in the Kilkis area.

In the area of Tumba Hrisafi, 1200 m northwest of the village, an ancient settlement was discovered, declared in 1996 a protected monument.

Transport 
The settlement is served by Hersos railway station, with services to Thessaloniki, Serres and Alexandroupoli.

References

Populated places in Kilkis (regional unit)